Garfield Boulevard is an east-west street on the south side of Chicago and its immediate western suburbs.  Its western segment, entirely known as 55th Street, runs east from Maple Avenue in Downers Grove until it becomes Joliet Road in Countryside.  Its eastern segment, known only as Garfield Boulevard from Western Avenue in Gage Park to Elsworth Drive in Washington Park, runs east from Archer Avenue and Narragansett Avenue to South Shore Drive, just west of U.S. Route 41 (Lake Shore Drive).  All of the eastern segment of 55th Street lies within the city limits of Chicago.

Route description
55th Street begins at Maple Avenue in Downers Grove.  In Clarendon Hills, the street intersects Illinois Route 83 (Kingery Highway).  As the road continues east into Hinsdale, 55th Street crosses from DuPage County to Cook County at County Line Road. Just east of the county line, the road passes over Interstate 294 (Tri-State Tollway).  In Countryside, 55th Street intersects U.S. Route 12/U.S. Route 20/U.S. Route 45 (LaGrange Road).  The western segment ends about one mile further east when the road becomes Joliet Road.

The two segments of 55th Street are split because Interstate 55 (Stevenson Expressway) runs in its path if it were to continue in either direction.

55th Street resumes at Archer Avenue and Narragansett Avenue near the western city limits of Chicago.  From Central Avenue to Illinois Route 50 (Cicero Avenue), 55th Street serves as the northern boundary for Midway Airport.  The next three roads that intersect 55th Street are Pulaski Road, Kedzie Avenue, and Western Avenue.  At Western Avenue, 55th Street officially becomes Garfield Boulevard.  Garfield Boulevard continues east, intersecting Halsted Street.  About three-fourths of a mile further east, Garfield Boulevard intersects Interstate 90/Interstate 94 (Dan Ryan Expressway).  After this intersection, the road intersects State Street and Michigan Avenue.  At Elsworth Drive in Washington Park, Garfield Boulevard is redesignated as 55th Street, intersecting Cottage Grove Avenue shortly east of this point. From Cottage Grove Avenue to University Avenue, 55th Street forms the northern boundary of the University of Chicago campus. 55th Street finally intersects South Shore Drive, where the street continues east until a cul-de-sac just west of U.S. Route 41 (Lake Shore Drive).

History
The section of the street renamed Garfield Boulevard was named to honor the twentieth president, James A. Garfield after his assassination in 1881.  The same was the case with the naming of Garfield Park.

Major intersections

References

Streets in Chicago
Boulevards in the United States